The Indian World of George Washington: The First President, the First Americans, and the Birth of the Nation is a book-length biography of George Washington with a focus on his relations with Native Americans. It was written by Colin G. Calloway and published by Oxford University Press in 2018.

It was a finalist for the 2018 National Book Award for Nonfiction.

References

Further reading

External links 

 

2018 non-fiction books
Books about George Washington
American history books
English-language books
Oxford University Press books
Books about Native American history